Miłowo  (formerly ) is a village in the administrative district of Gmina Stepnica, within Goleniów County, West Pomeranian Voivodeship, in north-western Poland.

The village has a population of 105.

References

Villages in Goleniów County